Martin David Boonzaayer (born November 1, 1972) is an American judoka, who was a member of the United States of America Judo team at the 2000 and 2004 Olympics. He was a three-time World Team Member, Seven-time National Champion, and won Bronze at the 2003 Pan American Games.  He also won ninth place in the 1999 World Championships as well as a Two Time Gold medalist at the US International Invitational (US Open) Championships, in addition to numerous other international podium finishes.

After retiring from competitive judo Boonzaayer opened his own real estate business.

See also
World Fit

References

1972 births
Living people
American male judoka
Judoka at the 2000 Summer Olympics
Judoka at the 2004 Summer Olympics
Judoka at the 2003 Pan American Games
Olympic judoka of the United States
Sportspeople from Kalamazoo, Michigan
Western Michigan University alumni
American real estate brokers
Pan American Games bronze medalists for the United States
Pan American Games medalists in judo
Arizona State University alumni
Medalists at the 2003 Pan American Games
21st-century American people